is a train station on the  Osaka Metro Imazatosuji Line and Nagahori Tsurumi-ryokuchi Line in Jōtō-ku, Osaka, Japan.

Lines 
Gamo Yonchome Station is served by the Osaka Metro Nagahori Tsurumi-ryokuchi Line (station number N23) and Imazatosuji Line (station number I18).

Station layout 
This station has an island platform with two tracks underground for each line, and fenced with platform screen doors.

Nagahori Tsurumi-ryokuchi Line

Imazatosuji Line

Jōtō-ku, Osaka
Railway stations in Osaka
Railway stations in Japan opened in 1990
Osaka Metro stations